The Camargue cross, or the cross of Camargue or cross of the gardians, is a symbol for the French region of Camargue, created in 1926 by the painter Hermann-Paul at the request of Folco de Baroncelli-Javon to represent the "Camargue nation" of herdsmen and fishermen. It embodies the three theological virtues of Christianity: faith (represented by tridents of gardians on a Christian cross), hope (represented by the anchor of sinners), and charity (represented by the heart of The Three Marys).

Background 

The Camargue cross was designed in 1926 by the painter-illustrator Hermann-Paul (1864–1940), at the request of his friend the marquis-writer-manadier Folco de Baroncelli (1869–1943), considered to be the "Inventor" of the Camargue. After having founded the Nacioun Gardiano association in 1904, to "maintain and glorify the costume, customs and traditions of the country of Arles, the Camargue and the bullfighting countries", he was inspired by the naval anchors to represent with this cross the "Camargue nation" of herdsmen and fishermen.

The poet Joseph d'Arbaud carried a gardian's trident made in wrought iron for him by Joseph Barbanson, a blacksmith from Saintes-Maries-de-la-Mer, in his workshop at Place de la Révolution (now Place du Grenier à Sel). It was d'Arbaud who suggested replacing the three fleur-de-lis (on a cross anchory) that were planned with camargue tridents as a symbol of the region.

The statue was inaugurated by the Committee of Friends of the Marquis de Baroncelli on July 7, 1926, in Saintes-Maries-de-la-Mer on a platform next to the post office (opposite the current "Grand Large" building).

The cross was transferred ten years later to the Pont du Mort (or the Maure), at the western entrance to the village on the road to Aigues-Mortes. After being slightly moved, the original cross was stolen. A copy of the original still stands there. In July 2016, the Camargue cross celebrated its 90th anniversary.

It is seen throughout all of Camargue. It is also present in Marseille (Notre-Dame de la Garde basilica, esplanade de la Bonne Mère), in Toulon, in Istres, and in Avignon. The town of Radolfzell, Germany, is a twin city with Istres, so the cross can be found there.

Symbolism 
The Camargue cross symbolizes the "Camargue Nation" (or "") by associating the symbols of the gardians, fishermen and Holy Marys of the Camargue.
 With its elements of early Christian symbolism, it embodies the three theological virtues:

faith (represented by tridents of the gardians on a Christian cross);
hope (represented by the anchor, which also represents fishermen); and 
charity (represented by the symbol of the heart of the Marys of the Sea).

Gallery

See also 

 Anchored cross

Citations

General bibliography

External links 

 Camargue traditions - La Croix. on the Saintes Maries de la Mer Tourist Office website

Camargue
Camargue